Witanowice may refer to the following places in Poland:
Witanowice, Lower Silesian Voivodeship (south-west Poland)
Witanowice, Lesser Poland Voivodeship (south Poland)